Apsey Green is a hamlet in Suffolk, England.

External links

Hamlets in Suffolk
Framlingham